Ramón Antonio Sampayo Ortíz (born 31 August 1957) is a Mexican politician affiliated with the PAN. As of 2013 he served as Deputy of the LXII Legislature of the Mexican Congress representing Tamaulipas.

References

1957 births
Living people
People from Matamoros, Tamaulipas
National Action Party (Mexico) politicians
21st-century Mexican politicians
Deputies of the LXII Legislature of Mexico
Members of the Chamber of Deputies (Mexico) for Tamaulipas